The P-class is a series of 12 container ships originally built for Pacific International Lines (PIL). The ships were built by Yangzijiang Shipyard in China and have a maximum theoretical capacity of around 11,923 twenty-foot equivalent units (TEU). In 2020 four of the ships were sold to Seaspan and two other ships were sold to Wan Hai Lines.

List of ships

References 

Container ship classes